The Big East Conference Women's Basketball Freshman of the Year, known as the Big East Conference Women's Basketball Rookie of the Year from 1989 to 2003, is an annual college basketball award presented to the top women's basketball freshman in the Big East Conference.

Key

Winners

Winners by school

References

Awards established in 1983
Freshman of the Year